Giulio Benedetto Isacco Vivanti (24 May 1859 – 19 November 1949) was an Italian mathematician. He was a mentor of Bruno de Finetti and he spent most of his academic career at the University of Pavia and University of Milan.

See also
Vivanti–Pringsheim theorem

References

1859 births
1949 deaths
Italian mathematicians
University of Bologna alumni